Zero is a 2021 Italian television series starring Giuseppe Dave Seke, Haroun Fall and Beatrice Grannò. It has been based on the novel I was never my age by Antonio Dikele Distefano It was released internationally on Netflix on April 21, 2021. On September 17, 2021, the series was canceled after one season.

Premise
Omar is a second generation Italian boy of Senegalese descent who lives in public housing within a suburb of Milan. Shy to the point of feeling invisible, this turns into an extraordinary superpower, which makes him actually invisible when feeling strong emotion.

His story is intertwined with that of other kids from the estate who want to preserve their homes and the neighbourhood in which they grew up that is threatened by building developers.

Cast
Giuseppe Dave Seke as Omar/Zero
Haroun Fall as Sharif
Beatrice Grannò as Anna Ricci
Richard Dylan Magon as Momo
Daniela Scattolin as Sara
Madior Fall as Inno
Virginia Diop as Awa
Alex Van Damme as Thierno
Frank Crudele as Sandokan
Giordano de Plano as Mr. Ricci
Ashai Lombardo Arop as Marieme
Roberta Mattei as The Virgin
Miguel Gobbo Diaz as Rico
Livio Kone as Honey

Episodes

References

External links
 
 

2020s Italian drama television series
2020s teen drama television series
2021 Italian television series debuts
2021 Italian television series endings
Fiction about interracial romance
Italian-language Netflix original programming
Superhero television shows
Television shows set in Milan